Floribunda may refer to:

Plants
 A former cactus genus now placed in Cipocereus
 Cassia floribunda, a synonym for Senna septemtrionalis, a plant species in the pea family
 Nuytsia floridunda, Western Australian Christmas tree
 Floribunda (rose), a popular garden rose cultivar group

Other uses
 Floribunda (horse), a thoroughbred racehorse
 Floribunda (sculpture), a 1998 bronze sculpture in Portland, Oregon